× Otaara, abbreviated Otr. in the horticultural trade, is an intergeneric hybrid of orchids, with Brassavola, Broughtonia, Cattleya and Laelia as parent genera.

References

Orchid nothogenera
Laeliinae